The Bezold effect is an optical illusion, named after a German professor of meteorology Wilhelm von Bezold (1837–1907), who discovered that a color may appear different depending on its relation to adjacent colors. 

It happens when small areas of color are interspersed. An assimilation effect called the von Bezold spreading effect, similar to spatial color mixing, is achieved. 

The opposite effect is observed when large areas of color are placed adjacent to each other, resulting in color contrast.

See also
 White's illusion

References
 Albers, J. Interaction of color: unabridged text and selected plates. 8. ed. Massachusetts: Yale University Press, 1978.
  Echo Productions. Wilhelm von Bezold. Virtual color museum.
Bergantini, Ernesto: Farbe im Design. Basiswissen, Gossau, 2010, p. 115.
 

Optical illusions
Color
Visual perception